Pauline Bonaparte as Venus Victrix ("Venus Victorious") is a semi-nude life-size reclining neo-Classical portrait sculpture by the Italian sculptor Antonio Canova.  Reviving the ancient Roman artistic traditions of portrayals of mortal individuals in the guise of the gods, and of the beautiful female form reclining on a couch (as most often seen in reclining portrayals of Hermaphroditi), it was commissioned by Pauline Bonaparte's husband Camillo Borghese and executed in Rome from 1805 to 1808, after the subject's marriage into the Borghese family.  It then moved to Camillo's house in Turin, then to Genoa, only arriving in its present home (the Galleria Borghese in Rome) around 1838.

The sculpture
Nude portraits were unusual, with subjects of high rank usually having strategically placed drapery (though Canova did produce another of the Bonaparte family, with his 1806 Napoleon as Mars the Peacemaker).  It is a matter of debate as to whether she actually posed naked for the sculpture, since only the head is a realistic (if slightly idealised) portrait, whilst the nude torso is a neo-classically idealised female form.  When asked how she could pose for the sculptor wearing so little, she reputedly replied that there was a stove in the studio that kept her warm, though this may be apocryphal or a quip deliberately designed by her to stir up scandal.

She holds an apple in her hand evoking Aphrodite's victory in the Judgement of Paris.  The room in which the sculpture is exhibited at the Galleria Borghese also has a ceiling painting portraying the judgement, painted by Domenico de Angelis in 1779 and inspired by a famous relief on the façade of the Villa Medici.  

Canova was first instructed to depict Pauline Bonaparte fully clothed as the chaste goddess Diana, hunter and virgin, but Pauline started to laugh and said that nobody would have believed she was a virgin. She had an international reputation for easy promiscuity, in France and in Italy, and may have enjoyed the provocation of posing naked in the Catholic Rome. Further, when Pauline was asked whether she really posed naked in front of Canova, she replied that in fact she was naked, and that it did not constitute a problem because Canova "was not a real man", and that the room was too warm to pose dressed. The subject of the sculpture may have also been affected by  the Borghese family's mythical ancestry: they traced their descent to Venus, through her son Aeneas, the founder of Rome.

The wooden base, draped like a catafalque, once contained a mechanism for rotating the sculpture, as in the case of other works by Canova and in the adapted bases of ancient sculpture in galleries, so that a viewer could observe it from all angles without moving him/herself. In the era of its production, viewers would also admire the sculpture by candlelight. The sculpture's lustre was not only due to the fine quality of the marble but also to the waxed surface, which has been recently restored.

The plaster original
The Museo Canova has the plaster cast of Venus Victrix, originally used as a model for the marble, in its , the museum's plaster cast gallery. During the first Battle of Monte Grappa in 1917, a Christmas-time bombing severed the head of the plaster and damaged parts of the hands, feet, and cloth. A 2004 restoration repaired this damage. In 2020, a tourist broke some of the toes as he sat on the plaster while posing for a selfie.

See also
 Venus Victrix

References

External links
 Galleria Borghese site

1808 sculptures
19th-century portraits
Marble sculptures in Italy
Nude sculptures
Portraits by Italian artists
Sculptures by Antonio Canova
 Canova
Sculptures of Venus
Sculptures of women in Italy